During the 2007–08 Dutch football season, PSV Eindhoven competed in the Eredivisie.

Season summary
The 2007-08 season was a turbulent one for PSV. Ronald Koeman left in early November to take charge at Valencia. Jan Wouters took charge as caretaker for the next month, before Sef Vergoossen was appointed interim manager for the rest of the season. Vergoossen guided the club to the UEFA Cup quarter-finals and won PSV's fourth successive Dutch title before stepping down at the end of the season.

PSV were disqualified from the KNVB Cup after fielding Manuel da Costa, who was suspended.

Kit
PSV's kits were manufactured by Nike and sponsored by Philips.

First-team squad
Squad at end of season

Left club during season

Results

Champions League

Group stage

Round of 32

Round of 16

Quarter-finals

References

Notes

PSV Eindhoven
PSV Eindhoven seasons
Dutch football championship-winning seasons